Boba ice cream bars are a frozen food, mainly eaten as a dessert or snack. It is an ice cream bar with boba bits throughout. The ice cream is usually made from dairy products, such as milk and cream, and can be flavored with other ingredients, such as green tea, thai tea, etc. The boba (or tapioca pearls) is made out of tapioca starch, becoming gelatinous when cooked. It is a combination of both creaminess from the ice cream and chewiness from the boba. The bars should be kept frozen and defrosted a little before eating.

Process 
Boba ice cream bars consist of ice cream and boba. A mixture of whole milk, heavy whipping cream, sugar, vanilla, and any additional flavors are mixed in a bowl until the mixture is homogeneous. Once homogeneous, the mixture is poured into an ice cream maker. Boba typically consists of tapioca starch, sweet rice flour (mochiko), brown sugar, and water. The dough is rolled into tiny spheres. The spheres are cooked in boiling water. When done, it is cooled in an ice bath so that they don't stick together. The boba is then mixed in with the ice cream. The boba and ice cream mixture is then put into popsicle molds and put into the freezer until the popsicles are hardened.

Regional application 
The idea of boba ice cream bars comes from a Taiwanese drink, bubble tea. Boba, or tapioca, is made from tapioca starch derived from cassava root. Ice cream, on the other hand, has a diverse history and originates from places such as China, the Middle East, and Europe. Boba ice cream bars can be consumed throughout the world.

References

Ice cream